Maiolo may refer to:

 Majolus of Cluny, Saint (910-994), Roman Catholic monk and fourth abbot of Cluny

 Alex Maiolo, American musician, writer, and health care reform advocate
 Mario Maiolo, Vice-President of the province of Cosenza, Italy
 Susanna Maiolo (born 1984), a woman with Italian and Swiss citizenship who rushed towards Pope Benedict XVI twice
 Tiziana Maiolo (born 1941), Italian politician
 Vincenzo Maiolo (born 1978),  Italian former footballer
 Maiolo, a comune (municipality) in the Province of Rimini, Emilia Romagna, Italy